The Angolan Basketball Federation (Federação Angolana de Basquetebol or simply FAB) is the governing body of official basketball competitions in Angola. FAB was founded in 1976, with Mr. José Jaime de Castro Guimarães serving as chairman. The federation was first housed at Rua Rainha Ginga and later moved to the current address on the ground floor of an apartment building located in the Cidadela Sports Compound. FAB oversees the activities of the 18 provincial basketball associations in the country. Typically the federation has a 42-member staff, including 3 members of the general assembly, 3 from the audit committee, 5 from the legal board, 5 from the disciplinary board and 16 collaborators while the management is made up of 10 members.

On an annual basis, the federation organizes the men's national championship aka BAI Basket, the women's championship as well as the Angolan Cup and Super Cup, including in the under-age categories. It also oversees the provincial championships organized by the related basketball associations and the participation of national squads in African and worldwide events.

History
As the most successful sports in Angola, together with handball, basketball in Angola celebrated on May 18, 2011, its diamond jubilee as it was in May 1930 that a basketball match was first played in the country. Since then, it's been 75 years of a successful journey. Mr. Pina Cabral, a Portuguese army officer and physical education teacher, organized in May 1930, the first exhibition game between Sporting Clube de Luanda and Associação Académica with an 8–5 final score for the former.

Angola played for the very first time internationally in a friendly against Nigeria in 1976 (lost 62-71), made its debut in the African arena in 1980 (7th place) and in the world arena at the 1986 FIBA World Championship in Madrid (20th place). At the 1992 Summer Olympics in Barcelona, the Angolan players must have lived a dream by sharing the court with the likes of Michael Jordan, Magic Johnson, Larry Bird, among others.

Current squads

Past squads

Africa Palmarès (national squad)
Men

Women

Participation in world events

National Champions

Men

Women

Angola Cup Winners
Men

Women

Angola Super Cup Winners
Men

Women

Africa Palmarès (clubs)
Men

Women

Chairman history

Head coaches history

Trivia
In a match played for the Lusophony (Portuguese-speaking countries) Games, on October 7, 2006, Angola beat East Timor 193–33 in what might be the highest score ever reached by the Angolan squad.

See also 
 BAI Basket
 Angola Basketball Cup
 Angola Basketball Super Cup
 Victorino Cunha Cup

References

External links 
  
 Angola basketball portal 
 Angolan Basketball - Afrobasket.com
Angolan Basketball Federation at Fiba Live Stats

National members of FIBA Africa
Sports governing bodies in Angola
Sports organizations established in 1976
Basketball in Angola